Cock of the Roost is a 1925 German silent comedy film directed by Georg Jacoby and starring Reinhold Schünzel, Elga Brink and Maly Delschaft.

The film's sets were designed by the art director Walter Reimann.

Cast

References

Bibliography
Dyer, Richard & Vincendeau, Ginette. Popular European Cinema. Routledge, 2013.

External links

Films of the Weimar Republic
German silent feature films
Films directed by Georg Jacoby
German black-and-white films
German comedy films
1925 comedy films
Silent comedy films
1920s German films
1920s German-language films